The Bulgarian Doubles Football Group was a Bulgarian football reserve team league. It existed for just two seasons – 2008–09 and 2009–10.

The 16 clubs that used to form the Doubles Groups were the 16 reserve teams of the clubs currently playing in the Bulgarian A Professional Football Group (A Group). They played their matches each Monday following the official fixtures of A Group but with a reverse home team (if Club A entertains Club B in their A Group match, Club B entertains Club A in their Doubles Groups match).

League tables

Season 2008–09

Season 2009–10

References

Defunct football leagues in Bulgaria
2008–09 in Bulgarian football
2009–10 in Bulgarian football